Black Canary (Dinah Laurel Lance) is a superheroine appearing in American comic books published by DC Comics. Lance is one of two women under the alias Black Canary within the DC Universe; she is Dinah Drake's daughter and successor of the superhero mantle in the post-Crisis narratives. She is commonly affiliated with the Justice League of America and the archer superhero Green Arrow, professionally and romantically. She is also a common member of the Birds of Prey.

Black Canary has been adapted into various media, including direct-to-video animated films, video games, and both live-action and animated television series, featuring as a main or recurring character in the shows Birds of Prey, Justice League Unlimited, Smallville, Batman: The Brave and the Bold, Young Justice and Arrow. In Birds of Prey she was played by Rachel Skarsten, and in Smallville she was played by Alaina Huffman. In Arrow and the Arrowverse shows the character Laurel Lance was portrayed by Katie Cassidy. Dinah Lance made her cinematic debut in the DC Extended Universe film Birds of Prey, portrayed by Jurnee Smollett-Bell, who will reprise the role in an upcoming HBO Max movie focusing on the character.

Fictional character biography

Post-Crisis

Following the universe-altering events of Crisis on Infinite Earths (concluding in March 1986), Black Canary's history was revised again. The mind-transplant story of 1983 was discarded; in this version of the story, the present-day Black Canary is Dinah Laurel Lance, who inherits the identity from her mother, Dinah Drake Lance. Although some references (for example, those in James Robinson's Starman series) tried to distinguish the two Canaries by calling the first "Diana", recent accounts have confirmed Dinah as the mother's given name.

The two Canaries' origin stories were told in full in Secret Origins #50 (August 1990). In this story, Dinah Drake is trained by her Irish father, detective Richard Drake, intending to follow him on the Gotham City police force. When she is turned down, her disillusioned father dies shortly afterwards. Determined to honor his memory, Dinah fights crime and corruption by any possible means. She becomes a costumed vigilante, using her inheritance to open a flower shop as her day job. Dinah marries her lover, private eye Larry Lance, and several years later their daughter, Dinah Laurel Lance, is born (Birds of Prey #66 (June 2004) would establish that they took the name "Laurel" from a librarian Dinah befriended during a case).

The younger Dinah has her own "canary cry"—in this version, the result of a metagene absent from both her parents—which (unlike the Silver Age Black Canary) she can control. Growing up surrounded by her mother's friends in the disbanded JSA (seeing them as uncles and aunts), she wishes to be a costumed hero like her mother, but the elder Dinah discourages her, feeling that the world has become too dangerous for her daughter to succeed. Regardless, Dinah finds fighters (including former JSA member Wildcat) who help her hone her skills, and after years of dedication and training, she assumes the mantle of Black Canary despite her mother's opposition. Like her mother, Dinah operates out of Gotham, with a day job in the family floral business.

In an early Birds of Prey issue, writer Chuck Dixon has Dinah briefly married and divorced at a young age. Although ex-husband Craig Windrow seems to need her help, he actually wants to reconcile after he embezzles from the mob. Dinah's early marriage and ex-husband are not mentioned again until the 2007 Black Canary limited series.

After joining the Justice League, Dinah meets Green Arrow (Oliver Queen). Although she dislikes him at first, they become romantically involved despite their age difference; opposite the earlier depiction, in the Modern Age stories, Oliver is considerably older than Dinah. Dinah is a League member for about six years, including a brief stint with Justice League International (JLI, which she helps found). After her mother's death from radiation poisoning received during her battle with Aquarius, Dinah feels that her time in the JLA is over. She moves to Seattle with Green Arrow and opens a flower shop, Sherwood Florist.

When Dinah belonged to the JLI during the 1980s, she wore a new costume, a blue-and-black full-body jumpsuit with a bird motif and a slightly looser fit instead of her traditional, skin-tight black outfit with fishnet stockings. The change was poorly received and short-lived, and later artists restored her original look.

Birds of Prey

When former Batgirl Barbara Gordon is seriously injured by the Joker, she reestablishes her crime-fighting career as Oracle, information broker to the superhero community. After briefly working with the Suicide Squad, she forms a covert-mission team. Since Barbara thinks that of all the superheroes Dinah has the most potential, Oracle asks Black Canary to become an operative.

Black Canary reinvents herself, trading her blonde wig for bleached blonde hair. Her relationship with Oracle is rocky at first, since her impulsiveness clashes with Oracle's organization. Gradually, they learn to work together and became friends. When Oracle flees from Blockbuster, Dinah rescues her and meets Barbara Gordon, deepening their friendship.

Infinite Crisis gives Earth a new timeline, with Wonder Woman again a founding member of the Justice League. In a  Week 51 back-up feature of 52, Black Canary is at the battle which forms the League. Its core is Black Canary, Green Lantern (Hal Jordan), the Martian Manhunter, the Flash (Barry Allen), Aquaman, Superman, Batman and Wonder Woman. In the 2007 Black Canary miniseries, she and Green Arrow join the Justice League after its founding and are tested by founding member Batman early in their membership.

During publication of the Infinite Crisis limited series, most DC Universe comic books advanced one year. After this "One Year Later" jump, Dinah trades life experiences with Lady Shiva to soften the warrior and begins a harsh training regimen in an unidentified Vietnamese shanty town. The regimen replicates Shiva's early life and training, and Shiva assumes Dinah's role in Oracle's group.

During Countdown, several series include tie-ins and run-ups to the wedding of Dinah and Ollie. The Black Canary Wedding Planner details the preparations; in Birds of Prey #109, Dinah and Barbara discuss the wedding (and Ollie). Countdown: Justice League Wedding Special, and Justice League #13 deal with the bachelor and bachelorette parties. A plot thread throughout is a plan by the Injustice League to attack the wedding.

Dinah resigns as JLA chairwoman after the team's confrontation with the Shadow Cabinet. After learning that Ollie began his own Justice League with Hal Jordan, she confronts him when he arrives at the Watchtower to warn her of an attack on the world's superheroes. Prometheus arrives and attacks the team, severing Red Arrow's arm and maneuvering Dinah into the path of an energy bolt fired by Mikaal Tomas. After Prometheus is defeated, he destroys Star City with a teleportation device. In their search for survivors, Dinah and Ollie discover the bloody body of Roy's daughter, Lian. Dinah goes to Roy's hospital bedside with Donna Troy to break the news about his daughter when he emerges from his coma.

In Blackest Night, Dinah travels to Coast City to fight Nekron's army of Black Lanterns. According to Nekron, he can control the heroes (including Ollie) who have died and been resurrected. Dinah fights her husband, now a Black Lantern, with Mia and Connor. Ollie regains control of his body long enough to miss his wife with a shot which severs a hose containing liquid nitrogen. Dinah orders Connor to use the hose on Ollie, freezing him solid, and the three join the rest of the heroes in battle.

When Ollie returns to normal, it is discovered that he secretly murdered Prometheus and left his body to rot at his headquarters. After Barry Allen and Hal Jordan confront Ollie and Dinah with the news, Ollie escapes. Dinah, Hal and Barry search the ruins of Star City for him, finding him looking for one of the men who worked for Prometheus. Ollie overpowers them, leaving Dinah in a restraining fluid. After Green Arrow surrenders for Prometheus' murder, Dinah visits him in jail and realizes that he wants to be left alone. She removes her wedding ring, leaving it with him, and does not attend his trial.

In Brightest Day, Dinah returns to Gotham in a relaunch of Birds of Prey with Gail Simone. In Birds of Prey #1 (July 2010), she is sent to save a child with Lady Blackhawk. After receiving a call from Oracle, the team (including Huntress) is reunited. They are confronted by a new villainess, White Canary, who has a grudge against Dinah and exposes her civilian identity. After capturing White Canary (the vengeful sister of the Twelve Brothers in Silk), Dinah learns that Lady Shiva is behind the attack on the Birds. Dinah and White Canary travel to Bangkok; when the Birds arrive a short time later, Dinah attacks them dressed as White Canary. Later, Dinah reveals that Sin  and her foster parents are being held hostage, their lives threatened unless Dinah challenges Lady Shiva to a fight to the death. Huntress offers to take Dinah's place instead, reasoning that she has too many people who love her. However, this gives Dinah the opportunity to rescue Sin with the help of one of White Canary's students, Terry, and race back to halt the duel between Helena and Shiva. While the duel is understood to be a matter of duty and honor, Dinah brings to their attention that there was no time mentioned and for now the fight must end, and to be resumed at a later time. While White Canary is displeased, Shiva sides with Black Canary and the Birds and the fight is over.

Bloodspell
Although the Black Canary–Zatanna graphic novel Bloodspell, written by Paul Dini and drawn by Joe Quinones, was scheduled for a 2012 release, it was delayed until May 2014. The story centers around the meeting of 16-year-old Dinah and Zatanna.

2010s and 2020s
During DC's The New 52 era which began in 2011, Black Canary was portrayed as a single character with a metahuman Canary Cry resulting from government experiments. However, DC later began to row back on controversial New 52 continuity changes with its DC Rebirth initiative, with the narrator of Geoff Johns' DC Rebirth #1, Wally West lamenting, from outside the universe, on how Black Canary and Green Arrow hardly know each other any more, when they should be husband and wife, as a result of sinister alterations to the timeline. The comic shows the pair briefly meeting, by chance, and then separately staying up at night, contemplating what is missing from their lives. They meet again in Green Arrow Rebirth #1, and instantly hit it off. In the ensuing Green Arrow series, Dinah is the first to notice something awry with Oliver's apparent suicide (in fact, an attempted assassination by Shado) and disappearance. She is also a current member of the Birds of Prey, as well as the Justice League of America. In Birds of Prey: Rebirth, it is revealed that Dinah and Barbara (Batgirl) have been good friends for a few years now, while just meeting Helena Bertinelli (Huntress). In Justice League of America, she is seen fighting Caitlin Snow (Killer Frost), and is later recruited by Batman due to the skills she possesses.

Following subsequent continuity-restoring events in Doomsday Clock and Dark Nights: Death Metal, the current Black Canary is re-established as being the daughter of her Golden Age predecessor, fully reversing the controversial New 52 changes.

Powers, abilities and equipment
Although depictions of Black Canary have varied over the years, she is often portrayed as a prodigious hand-to-hand combatant, having mastered styles such as Aikido, Boxing, Capoeira, Hapkido, Judo,,Jeet Kune Do, Jujutsu, Karate, Kung Fu, Krav Maga, Muay Thai, Savate, Taekwondo, Shuri-te, Wing Chun, and Wrestling. She has been trained by other top-tier fighters, such as Wildcat, Lady Shiva, Cassandra Cain, and Wonder Woman, as well as having bested Batman, from time to time, in hand-to-hand combat.  In addition to her martial arts skills, Black Canary has been depicted as an expert motorcyclist, gymnast, covert operative and investigator. She is also an excellent leader and tactician, having served as the field commander of the Birds of Prey and the leader of the Justice League and League of Assassins for a time.

Her superpower, the canary cry, allows her to create ultrasonic vibrations whenever she screams, allowing her to severely damage both organic and inorganic objects. Her canary cry has been depicted as having ten-fold the capabilities of most sonic weapons and has even been depicted as breaking metals and having the resonance to affect and shatter the Earth. During the New 52 era, Black Canary learned how to use her cry to glide and propel herself across long distances by screaming downwards. Due to this reliance on speech, she is often bound and gagged by villains as a means of incapacitation. Due to the sheer strength of her abilities, Black Canary often relies on her martial arts skills instead, preferring to use her canary cry only during urgent situations, such as against superpowered opponents.

The origin of Black Canary's canary cry has been retconned over the course of her character history, with it being originally depicted as magical in origin due to being cursed by the Wizard. Later, the cry is depicted as an inborn metahuman ability. During the New 52 era, her ability was said to result of human experimentation by the executive leaders of Team 7, involving her being treated with genes from an alien girl named Ditto.

Reception
IGN rated her its 81st-greatest all-time comic book hero. She was number 26 on Comics Buyer's Guide's "100 Sexiest Women in Comics" list.

In other media

Television

Live-action 
 Black Canary's first live-action appearance was Danuta Wesley's 1979 portrayal in NBC's two Legends of the Superheroes specials.

 The character appeared in the short-lived 2002 television series Birds of Prey, an adaptation of the comic book. Dinah Lance became Dinah Redmond (played by Rachel Skarsten) a teenage runaway with psychic powers. Her mother Carolyn Lance (played by Lori Loughlin) was Black Canary with a supersonic canary cry.

 In 2008, Smallville introduced Black Canary (played by Alaina Huffman) as an assassin who is recruited for Green Arrow's team of superheroes. She appears in a number of episodes, including several season premieres and finales.

 Katie Cassidy portrays Laurel Lance, a re-imagining of the character adapted for television series set in the Arrowverse, making her debut in the 2012 pilot episode of Arrow. In the series, Laurel is a district attorney, the daughter of Starling City Police Department detective Quentin (Paul Blackthorne) and Dinah Lance (Alex Kingston), sister of Sara Lance / White Canary, and was the ex-girlfriend of billionaire-turned-vigilante Oliver Queen / Green Arrow (Stephen Amell). Following Sara’s death in the third season premiere, Laurel follows into her sister’s footsteps as the Black Canary and joining “Team Arrow”. In the fourth season, Damien Darhk murders Laurel as a promise he made to Quentin at the time when the latter was working for him. In the second season of The Flash, an evil Earth-2 doppelgänger of Laurel known as Black Siren is recruited by Zoom but is eventually defeated by Team Flash and is held captive at S.T.A.R. Labs. In the fifth season of Arrow, vigilante serial killer Prometheus breaks out Black Siren to taunt with Oliver, however, Team Arrow eventually discover she is a doppelgänger. In the seventh season, Black Siren redeems herself by helping Oliver getting set free from Slabside Prison and later returns to Earth-2 as Black Canary. In the eighth and final season, The Monitor turns Laurel on Oliver in exchange that he would assure she will return to her respective homeworld Earth-2. Laurel was among those erased from the anti-matter wave during the Anti-Monitor crisis, but was restored by Oliver who became the Spectre and sacrificed himself to kill the Anti-Monitor and restore the multiverse.

Animation 
 Dinah Laurel Lance appears in Justice League Unlimited, voiced by Morena Baccarin.
 Dinah Laurel Lance appears in Batman: The Brave and the Bold, voiced by Grey DeLisle. This version is a member of the Birds of Prey alongside Catwoman and Huntress. Grey DeLisle reprises her role in Scooby-Doo! & Batman: The Brave and the Bold.
 Dinah Laurel Lance appears in Young Justice, voiced by Vanessa Marshall. This version is a member of the Justice League and combat trainer and therapist for the Team.
 Black Canary makes a cameo in the Justice League Action animated short webisode "Selfie Help!", in one of Space Cabbie's selfies.
 Classic and modern versions of the character appear in several DC Universe Animated Original Movies. Kari Wahlgren voices Black Canary in the Green Arrow series of DC Nation Shorts.

Film 
Dinah Lance is portrayed by Jurnee Smollett in the DC Extended Universe.
 Smollett's Black Canary debuted in the 2020 film Birds of Prey.
 Smollett will reprise her role in an upcoming HBO Max film centered on the character.

Video games
 Jennifer Hale and Grey DeLisle reprise the character in video games, appearing in Justice League Heroes for PlayStation Portable and Batman: The Brave and the Bold – The Videogame respectively.
 Black Canary appears as a non-playable character in DC Universe Online, voiced by Kelley Huston.
 Black Canary appears in Lego Batman 2: DC Super Heroes and Lego Batman 3: Beyond Gotham, voiced again by Kari Wahlgren.
 Black Canary appears in Young Justice: Legacy, voiced again by Vanessa Marshall.
 Black Canary appears as a playable character in Injustice 2, voiced again by Vanessa Marshall.

See also
 Black Canary (comic book)
 Woman warrior

References

External links
 Earth-1 Black Canary at Mike's Amazing World of Comics

Alternative versions of comics characters
 
Birds of Prey
Black Canary characters
Characters created by Carmine Infantino
Characters created by Robert Kanigher
Comics characters introduced in 1969
DC Comics female superheroes
DC Comics martial artists
DC Comics metahumans
DC Comics orphans
Experimental medical treatments in fiction
Fictional characters who can manipulate sound
Fictional detectives
Fictional female martial artists
Fictional female secret agents and spies
Fictional women soldiers and warriors
Green Arrow characters
Irish superheroes
Vigilante characters in comics